Parc Saint-Victor is a football stadium in Cap-Haïtien, Haiti. It is the home stadium of AS Capoise and Zénith of the Ligue Haïtienne. The stadium holds 9,500 spectators.

External links
Stadium information 

Football venues in Haiti
Cap-Haïtien